Park Battery was an artillery battery located in King Edward Park near The Hill, New South Wales, Australia. The battery was part of Fortress Newcastle. Two 6 inch Mk VII guns were installed at Park Battery.

References
Horner, David (1995). The Gunners. A History of Australian Artillery. Sydney: Allen & Unwin. .

Military history of Australia during World War II
Artillery units and formations of Australia
Military establishments in the Hunter Region
History of Newcastle, New South Wales
Former military installations in New South Wales